Riverdale Municipality is a rural municipality (RM) in the Canadian province of Manitoba.

History

The RM was incorporated on January 1, 2015 via the amalgamation of the RM of Daly and the Town of Rivers. It was formed as a requirement of The Municipal Amalgamations Act, which required that municipalities with a population less than 1,000 amalgamate with one or more neighbouring municipalities by 2015. The Government of Manitoba initiated these amalgamations in order for municipalities to meet the 1997 minimum population requirement of 1,000 to incorporate a municipality.

Communities
 Bradwardine
 Rivers
 Wheatland

Demographics 

References

External links 

Official website
Our Heritage, The Town of Rivers and Area

2015 establishments in Manitoba
Manitoba municipal amalgamations, 2015
Populated places established in 2015
Rural municipalities in Manitoba